Wheel of death may refer to:

 Wheel of Death (Space Wheel), a large rotating apparatus on which acrobatic and balancing feats are performed
 Wheel of death (impalement arts), a stunt performed by knife throwers
 "Wheel of Death", an episode of Murder, She Wrote
 The Wheel of Death, a 1972 book by Philip Kapleau

See also
 Breaking wheel, a torture and execution device